The Rocky Horror Show is a musical with music, lyrics and book by Richard O'Brien. A humorous tribute to the science fiction and horror B movies of the 1930s through to the early 1960s, the musical tells the story of a newly engaged couple getting caught in a storm and coming to the home of a mad transvestite scientist, Dr Frank-N-Furter, unveiling his new creation, Rocky, a sort of Frankenstein-style monster in the form of an artificially made, fully grown, physically perfect muscle man complete "with blond hair and a tan".

The show was produced and directed by Jim Sharman. The original London production of the musical was premièred at the Royal Court Theatre (Upstairs) on 19 June 1973 (after two previews on 16 and 18 June 1973). It later moved to several other locations in London and closed on 13 September 1980. The show ran for a total of 2,960 performances and won the 1973 Evening Standard Theatre Award for Best Musical. Songs in the musical include "Time Warp" (co-written by O'Brien and Richard Hartley), while the costumes were designed by Sue Blane. Its 1974 debut in the US in Los Angeles had a successful nine-month run, but its 1975 Broadway debut at the Belasco Theatre lasted only three previews and forty-five showings, despite earning one Tony nomination and three Drama Desk nominations. Various international productions have since spanned across six continents as well as West End and Broadway revivals and eight UK tours. Actor Tim Curry, who originated the role of Dr. Frank-N-Furter in the original London production, became particularly associated with the musical.

The musical was adapted into the 1975 film The Rocky Horror Picture Show, starring O'Brien as Riff Raff, with Curry also reprising his role; the film has the longest-running release in film history. In 2016, it was adapted into the television film The Rocky Horror Picture Show: Let's Do the Time Warp Again. The musical was ranked eighth in a BBC Radio 2 listener poll of the "Nation's Number One Essential Musicals", and it featured on a commemorative stamp issued by the Royal Mail in 2011.

Beyond its cult status, The Rocky Horror Show is also widely said to have been an influence on countercultural and sexual liberation movements that followed on from the 1960s. It was one of the first popular musicals to depict fluid sexuality during a time of division between generations and a lack of sexual difference acceptance. Like the film adaptation, the musical is noted for a long-running tradition of audience participation through call-back lines and attending dressed up as characters from the show.

History

As an out-of-work actor in London in the early 1970s, Richard O'Brien wrote The Rocky Horror Show to keep himself busy on winter evenings. Since his youth, he had developed a passion for science fiction and B horror movies; he wanted to combine elements of the unintentional humour of B horror movies, portentous dialogue of schlock-horror, Steve Reeves muscle films, and fifties rock and roll into The Rocky Horror Show. A major theme running throughout the musical is transvestism, which according to O'Brien was not originally meant to be as prominent as it ended up being. He conceived and wrote the play set against the backdrop of the glam era that had manifested itself throughout British popular culture in the early 1970s; he has stated "glam rock allowed me to be myself more", allowing his concept to come into being.

O'Brien took a small amount of his unfinished Rocky Horror to Australian director Jim Sharman, who decided he wanted to direct it at the small experimental space Upstairs at the Royal Court Theatre in Sloane Square, Chelsea, London, which was used as a project space for new work. Sharman had received considerable local acclaim as the director of the original Australian productions of Hair and Jesus Christ Superstar. He went to London to direct the first British stage production of Superstar, during which he met O'Brien, who had played King Herod for just one performance. Sharman brought fellow Australians Nell Campbell and long-time scenic designer partner Brian Thomson into the production.

Star Tim Curry recalled his first encounter with the script:

The original creative team was then rounded out by costume designer Sue Blane and musical director Richard Hartley, although Pete Moss would later take over as musical director. Michael White was also brought in to produce Rocky Horror. As the musical went into rehearsal, the working title for it became They Came from Denton High, but it was changed just before previews at the suggestion of Sharman to The Rocky Horror Show.

After two previews, the show was premièred—without an interval—at the Royal Court's 63-seat Theatre Upstairs on 19 June 1973, and ran until 20 July 1973. The cast included Tim Curry, who had decided that Dr Frank-N-Furter should not just be a queen, he should speak like the Queen of the United Kingdom, extravagantly posh, Patricia Quinn, Nell Campbell (billed as Little Nell), Julie Covington, and O'Brien, with each performing in an all-out camp style. It was a creative triumph and a critical and commercial success. A reviewer at the premiere for The Guardian wrote "it achieves the rare feat of being witty and erotic at the same time", and Curry gives a "garishly Bowiesque performance as the ambisextrous doctor." Record producer Jonathan King saw it on the second night and signed the cast to make the original cast recording over a long weekend—The Rocky Horror Show Original London Cast—that was rushed out on his UK Records label. King was involved heavily in the initial promotion for the show, as well as being the minority backer of it financially with White having a majority share.

The impact at the Royal Court Upstairs allowed the production be transferred to the 230-seat Chelsea Classic Cinema nearby on Kings Road from 14 August 1973 to 20 October 1973. Rocky Horror found a quasi-permanent home at the 500-seat King's Road Theatre—another cinema house, even further down Kings Road—from 3 November 1973. The show received critical praise and won the 1973 Evening Standard Award for Best Musical. When Richard O'Brien played Riff Raff in the original Broadway production of Rocky Horror in 1975 Robert Longden took over the role in London.

The show's run at the King's Road Theatre ended on 31 March 1979; it then transferred to the Comedy Theatre (now the Harold Pinter Theatre) to begin performances on 6 April 1979. At the new venue, Rocky Horror required some restaging, for the Comedy was the first theatre at which the musical had played that possessed a traditional proscenium arch stage. For the first time, the musical was also broken into two acts with an interval. It finished its run there on 13 September 1980.

Synopsis

Act I
The Usherette, sometimes referred to as "Trixie", who works in a derelict cinema, introduces tonight's "film" in a song ("Science Fiction/Double Feature"), with masked Phantoms providing the backing vocals.

After attending the wedding of his best friend since high school (Ralph Hapschatt, now married to Janet Weiss' friend Betty Munroe), Brad Majors confesses his love to Janet Weiss ("Dammit Janet") and the two become engaged. The Narrator appears and explains that Brad and Janet are leaving Denton to visit Dr Everett Scott, their former science tutor, while driving into a rainstorm. During the trip, their car has a flat tire and they are forced to walk through the rain to seek a telephone in an old castle ("Over at the Frankenstein Place").

The Narrator explains that Brad and Janet are feeling "apprehensive and uneasy", but must accept any help that they are offered. As Brad and Janet arrive, Riff Raff, the hunchbacked handyman and live-in butler, greets them, and his sister Magenta, the maid, appears. Riff Raff, Magenta and Columbia (a groupie) speak briefly of an unlucky delivery boy named Eddie who fell victim to unfortunate circumstances because he botched a delivery, before performing the show's signature dance number ("Time Warp"). Brad and Janet try to leave at this point, but are stopped when Dr Frank-N-Furter, a bisexual, cross-dressing mad scientist, arrives. He introduces himself as "a sweet transvestite from Transsexual, Transylvania" and invites Brad and Janet up to his laboratory ("Sweet Transvestite"). As he goes up, Brad and Janet are stripped to their underwear to dry off.

Brad and Janet enter the laboratory, where Frank-N-Furter gives them laboratory coats to wear. Frank announces that he has discovered the secret to life itself. He unveils his creation, a blond, well-built man named Rocky, who is brought to life. As his bandages are removed, Rocky worries about his predicament ("The Sword of Damocles"). Frank admires Rocky's physique by singing a tribute to muscle builders ("Charles Atlas Song"/"I Can Make You a Man"). A Coca-Cola freezer in the laboratory opens to reveal Frank and Columbia's former lover, Eddie, a biker covered in surgical scars, who has been rendered a (slightly more) brain-damaged zombie, intent on rescuing Columbia, and escaping the castle while successfully causing large amounts of damage to Frank's laboratory, exhibiting signs of partially returning memory of the way he lived life in the past ("Hot Patootie – Bless My Soul"). Frank panics, forces Eddie back into the freezer and hacks him to death (his weapon of choice typically being a pick axe or chainsaw). Frank tells Rocky — the recipient of the other half of Eddie's brain — that he prefers him over Eddie ("Charles Atlas Song (Reprise)"/"I Can Make You a Man (Reprise)"), as although he and Eddie had a strong mental relationship, he had no muscle, and therefore, had to go. Brad and Janet, somewhat flustered after witnessing the re-murdering of Eddie, are then ushered to separate bedrooms for the night.

Act II
The Narrator foreshadows that Brad and Janet may be unsafe. Janet enjoys Brad's advances in her darkened bedroom before realizing that it is Frank in disguise. He convinces Janet that pleasure is no crime, and after she asks him to promise not to tell Brad, they resume their lovemaking. The scene changes to Brad's darkened bedroom, where Brad makes love to Janet before discovering that, once again, it is Frank in disguise. Frank promises not to tell Janet, but as they resume, Riff Raff interrupts on the television monitor with the message that Rocky has escaped. Janet searches for Brad in the laboratory and discovers Rocky hiding there. Checking the television monitor, Janet sees Brad in bed with Frank and seduces Rocky ("Touch-a, Touch-a, Touch-a, Touch Me"). While searching the television monitor for Rocky, the rest of the group discovers that Janet has slept with him and Brad becomes hurt and angry ("Once in a While"). Riff Raff then notifies Frank that there is another visitor entering the castle: Dr. Everett Scott, the paraplegic science tutor whom Brad and Janet intended to visit.

Dr Scott in a wheelchair is wheeled into the laboratory by Columbia, where Frank accuses him and Brad of trying to investigate his castle, knowing that Dr Scott has connections with the FBI. Dr Scott assures him that he has come in search of Eddie, who is revealed to be his nephew ("Eddie's Teddy"). Frank displays Eddie's corpse to the group and then uses a device to electronically restrain the three visitors and a rebellious Rocky to the floor ("Planet Schmanet Janet"); the inhabitants of the castle are revealed to be space aliens led by Frank, who abandoned their original mission in order to engage in kinky sex with Earthlings and work on Rocky. Magenta insists that they return to their home planet now that they have been found out; Frank refuses and, instead, declares his intentions to put on a "floor show".

Under Frank's influence, Columbia, Rocky, Brad, and Janet perform song and dance routines while clad in lingerie ("Rose Tint My World (Floor Show)"). After, Frank entices them to lose all inhibition and give in to their natural carnal instincts, resulting in everyone beginning to engage in orgiastic sex ("Don't Dream It – Be It") before Frank leads them into the rousing concluding number of the floor show ("Wild and Untamed Thing"). The show comes to an abrupt end when Riff Raff and Magenta enter, wearing spacesuits and carrying ray guns. Riff Raff declares that he is usurping Frank's authority and taking them all back to their home planet ("Transit Beam"). Frank makes a final plea for sympathy from Riff Raff, trying to make him understand his desire to spend the rest of his life having sex with Earthlings ("I'm Going Home"). Riff Raff is unmoved and guns down Columbia, Frank, and Rocky before ordering Brad, Janet, and Dr. Scott to leave.

As the trio evacuates the castle, Riff Raff and Magenta express their excitement to return to their world and do the "Time Warp" again with their fellow Transylvanians ("Spaceship"). Brad and Janet watch as the castle blasts off into outer space, confused about the implications of their sexual escapades ("Super Heroes"). To conclude his tale, the Narrator says "and crawling on the planet's face, insects called the human race, lost in time, and lost in space – and meaning." As the show ends, The Usherette returns to recount the night's events ("Science Fiction/Double Feature (Reprise)").

In the original London and Los Angeles productions, "Sweet Transvestite" came before "Time Warp". This was changed for the film version and was subsequently updated for the stage version when O'Brien revised the script for the 1990 West End revival.
"Charles Atlas Song" was replaced by a reworked version of the song, "I Can Make You a Man", for the film version. O'Brien's revision of the script in 1990 featured a hybrid of the two songs under the title "I Can Make You a Man", in the 1999 revised script this song was replaced by the film version, which continues to be used in all major productions. The reprise remains unchanged except for the title.

Other productions

Original Los Angeles production (American premiere)
Lou Adler had made millions with risky ventures such as Monterey Pop. His record label, Ode Records was becoming known for harvesting experimental talent. In the late winter of 1973, Adler was in London and attended a performance of the show with Britt Ekland. Acting on impulse and seeing a hit, he met backstage with producers and within 36 hours had secured the American theatrical rights.

The show premiered at the Roxy Theatre in Los Angeles on 24 March 1974, running for nine months. The cast was all new except for Tim Curry. The show played to a full house and a deal was made with 20th Century Fox for a film. Fox executive Gordon Stulberg saw the show at the Roxy and agreed to invest $1 million in the film project. Adler's attempt to turn his club into a playhouse was successful. The singer Meat Loaf remembers different celebrities who would come to the show, resulting in him meeting Elvis Presley at a performance. Future U.S. Senator Al Franken was a young lighting apprentice brought in by Sid Strong. He recalls Adler had the show mounted by producer Brian Avnet and that both Curry and O'Brien were brought in from the UK.

Original Sydney production (Australian premiere)
Harry M. Miller produced the original Sydney production of Rocky Horror, which opened on 19 April 1974 at the New Arts Cinema (formerly The Astor, later The Valhalla and now an office building) in Glebe. It starred Reg Livermore as Frank-N-Furter, Jane Harders as Janet Weiss, Kate Fitzpatrick as Usherette and Magenta, Arthur Dignam as Narrator, Sal Sharah as Riff-Raff, John Paramor as Brad Majors, Graham Matters as Rocky, Maureen Elkner as Columbia, David Cameron as Eddie and Dr. Scott with Bob Hudson and Piero Von Arnam and Julie McGregor.

Original Melbourne/Adelaide production
After eighteen-month run in Sydney, Harry M. Miller's production moved to Melbourne, with Max Phipps taking over the star role. It opened at the Regent Palace Theatre on 24 October 1975 and ran through 19 months and 458 performances, finally closing on 28 May 1977.

The Melbourne production included Max Phipps - Frank-N-Furter; Gregory Apps - Brad (later Stephen Clark); Paula Maxwell - Janet (later Shirley-Anne Kear, Diana Greentree); Tommy Dysart - narrator; Sal Sharah - Riff-Raff; Robyn Moase - Magenta (later Joan Brockenshire); Sue Smithers - Columbia (later Shirley-Anne Kear, Joan Millar); Graham Matters - Rocky (later Grant Whiteman, Clive Blackie); Terry Bader - Eddie/Dr Scott (later David Cameron, William Gluth).  When Paula Maxwell left, resident stage director, Roland Rocchiccioli, moved Kear (at her request) into the role of Janet, and Joan Miller, who was an understudy, took over from Kear as Columbia. 
It was in Melbourne, during the Sword of Damocles number, that Grant Whiteman fell while swinging on ladder and being pursued by Max Phipps. Fortunately, there was a Doctor in the house. Without missing a beat, Rocchiccioli told Clive Blackie to get into the costume: "This is your big chance. You're on!" he said. The show picked up from where Whiteman had fallen and went-on without further hitch. Soon after that Whiteman left, and, to Blackie's surprise, Rocchiccioli put him into the role - without hesitation. He said to him: "You're the understudy. Of course you take over. That's what you're here for!" He proved a very popular Rocky. What he lacked in height he made-up for in muscle. 
The show then transferred to Adelaide, where it opened on 12 August 1977 at The Warner Theatre. Max Phipps, Diana Greentree, Joan Millar, Tommy Dysart and Joan Brockenshire went on to reprise their roles from the Melbourne production. Staged by Roland Rocchiccioli, the Adelaide production – which was a transfer of Jim Sharman's original Sydney and Melbourne productions, and adapted for the new theatre, was not a success, and closed after only two months. As Rocchiccioli said on ABC Television in Adelaide, talking with Clive Hale: "It is the same Jim Sharman production as Melbourne. It is Brian Thomson's design, except the set has been altered slightly because this is not a television theatre in the last days of its existence!" Rocchiccioli later said he was astonished that it did not work in Adelaide after playing in Melbourne for the two-years previous. Some weeks the company did ten performances, so great was the demand for tickets. It would have gone on running - possibly for another year - if Max Phipps had not decided to leave. He was exhausted. In the final months Harry M Miller was selling standing-room at the back of the theatre for up to 50-patrons per performance.

After several weeks in Adelaide, Jon Finlayson replaced Max Phipps as Frank-N-Furter. Max had come-in to the production at the last moment, after Darrell Hilton and Rocchiccioli agreed on a parting of the ways, just days before the opening night. Other cast members included Tony Preece as Brad; Keith Reid (who was the Melbourne understudy) as Riff-Raff; Bill Binks as Eddie/Dr. Scott; and Shane Bourne as Rocky. The Adelaide reviews were
savage, and killed the production. Everyone was taken by surprise, including Max Phipps, who was brilliant in the role. Rocchiccioli said at the time: "It's baffling. Nothing has changed from Melbourne, and it's difficult to know why they hate it so much". It is the only time the Rocky Horror Show has not been critically applauded in Australia. The show closed after two months, after running from 12 August to October 1977.

Original New York City (Broadway) production

In early 1975, Adler closed the show at the Roxy Theatre after a ten-month run. This gave actors time to return to the UK for the film version's shooting. Adler planned to open on Broadway just before the film's release. It was anticipated that this production would be as successful as Jesus Christ Superstar and serve as a public vehicle for the film version. It was unsuccessful and closed after 45 performances.

Original San Francisco production
The third U.S. production opened at the Montgomery Playhouse in San Francisco on 3 February 1976 and played 103 performances, closing on 30 May. The San Francisco production was directed by A. Michael Amarino, with musical direction and arrangements by Michael Reno. The production had a new cast and starred David James as Frank. The opening night cast included Roslyn Roseman as Trixie/Usherette/Magenta, Needa Greene as Janet, Robert Reynolds as Brad, Richard Gee as the Narrator, Buddy King as Riff Raff, Paula Desmond as Columbia, Bob Dulaney as Rocky, and Emil Borelli as Eddie/Dr Scott, with back-up vocals by Vikki D'Orazi, William J. Tacke, and Kelly St. John.

Second London (West End) production
The Rocky Horror Show transferred to the 820-seat Comedy Theatre on Panton Street in the West End, running from 6 April 1979 until 13 September 1980, closing the play's initial run of 2,960 performances. After occasional productions in the early 1980s, the play was revived for the Theatre Royal, Hanley tour in 1984 and still is performed regularly in the UK.

The Haymarket Production, Leicester 
On Wednesday 8 August 1979 The Haymarket Production of The Rocky Horror Show, presented in association with Cameron Mackintosh and Michael White, began a month-long run at the Leicester Haymarket Theatre. After its Haymarket run followed a major national tour to Wolverhampton, Norwich, Leeds, Bristol, Newcastle, Birmingham, Brighton, York, Lincoln, Southsea, Oxford, and ending at Cork, Ireland in December 1979.

The lead part of Frank-N-Furter was played by Daniel Abineri. Others in the cast included Claire Lewis as Magenta/Usherette, Amanda Redman as Janet Weiss, Terence Hillyer as Brad Majors, Nicholas Courtney as Narrator, Brett Forrest as Riff Raff, Dee Robillard as Columbia, Gary Martin as Rocky, Trevor Byfield as Eddie/Dr. Scott, Nicola Blackman, Martyn Boydon, Michael Kirk and Sarah Payne.

Music

Theatre Upstairs at The Royal Court
 "Science Fiction/Double Feature"
 "Dammit, Janet!"
 "Over at the Frankenstein Place"
 "Sweet Transvestite"
 "The Time Warp"
 "The Sword of Damocles"
 "I Can Make You a Man"
 "What Ever Happened to Saturday Night?"
 "Touch-a, Touch-a, Touch-a, Touch Me"
 "Once in a While"
 "Eddie's Teddy"
 "Planet, Schmanet, Janet"
 "Rose Tint My World/Don't Dream It, Be It/Wild and Untamed Thing"
 "I'm Going Home"
 "Superheroes"
 "Science Fiction/Double Feature (Reprise)"
At the Classic Cinema and King's Road Theatre (Formerly the Essoldo Cinema), the following songs were added: "I Can Make You a Man", a reprise of the same and "Eddie's Teddy".

Broadway
 "Science Fiction" - Trixie
 "Damn-it Janet" - Brad and Janet
 "Over at the Frankenstein Place" - Janet, Brad, and Riff Raff
 "Sweet Transvestite" - Frank and Company
 "Time Warp" - Magenta, Columbia, Riff-Raff, and the Narrator
 "The Sword of Damocles" - Rocky
 "Charles Atlas Song" - Frank
 "Hot Patootie" - Eddie
 "Charles Atlas Song (Reprise)" - Frank
 "Eddie's Teddy" - Dr. Scott, Columbia, and Company
 "Once in a While" - Brad
 "Planet Schmanet Janet" - Frank
 "Rose Tint My World" - Company
 "Superheroes" - Company
 "Science Fiction (Reprise)" - Trixie
 "Sweet Transvestite (Reprise)" - Company
 "Time Warp (Reprise)" - Company

National and international productions

UK productions
The Rocky Horror Show has toured the United Kingdom regularly since the 1990–91 West End revival at the Piccadilly Theatre in productions produced by Richard O'Brien's and Howard Panter's Rocky Horror Company. Notable celebrities have been cast including Daniel Abineri, Peter Blake, Tim McInnerny, Anthony Head, Robin Cousins, Jason Donovan and Jonathan Wilkes as Frank-N-Furter, Gina Bellman as Janet Weiss, Edward Tudor-Pole as Riff Raff and TV's Craig Ferguson and Adrian Edmonson as Brad Majors.

Richard O'Brien's Rocky Horror Show completed its 2006–2007 tour on 14 July 2007 in Woking, Surrey after touring for almost eighteen months. The tour was directed by Christopher Luscombe and featured David Bedella as Frank. The 2006 tour cast, accompanied by Roger Lloyd-Pack as the Narrator and author O'Brien, performed "The Time Warp" live in Trafalgar Square on 22 July 2006 as part of The Big Dance event and was broadcast on BBC1's Dancing in the Street. In 2008 David Bedella released his first album The Dean St. Sessions, produced by Nathan Amzi, which included a duet with O'Brien singing "I'm Going Home" as a bonus video.

In March 2009, the show returned with a new UK tour starting in the autumn. With Christopher Luscombe returning as the director, the tour was a revival of the 2006–2007 production with some adjustments to the direction, lighting, choreography, costumes and musical arrangements. The tour opened on 17 September 2009 at the New Wimbledon Theatre and closed on 4 December 2010 at the newly opened Aylesbury Waterside Theatre.

The first leg of the tour ran from September 2009 to July 2010 with a short break over the Christmas period. David Bedella reprised his role as Frank. The second leg of the tour began on 1 September 2010 at the New Victoria Theatre, Woking with several changes to the cast. During the UK tour's summer break director Christopher Luscombe and the show's creative team recreated the UK production in Seoul, South Korea with a new cast of American, Australian and New Zealander actors and local celebrities as the Narrator. The production played from August until October 2010 before a five-week New Zealand tour in November and December with Richard O'Brien making a rare appearance as the Narrator.

2006 Charity concert
On 3 May 2006, a benefit concert version of the musical to raise money for Amnesty International. Entitled The Rocky Horror Tribute Show, it was staged at the Royal Court Theatre (where the show had its world premiere in 1973) as a one night only event hosted by Richard O'Brien. The cast featured Anthony Head and Michael Ball sharing the role of Frank-N-Furter, Ade Edmondson and Stephen Gately sharing the role of Brad, Joanne Farrell and Sophie Lawrence sharing the role of Janet, Kraig Thornber as Riff Raff, Toyah Willcox as Magenta, Amy Rosefield as Columbia, Gary Amers as Rocky Horror, Ben Richards as Eddie, Julian Littman as Dr. Scott, and original cast member Patricia Quinn as The Usherette. Christopher Biggins, Rayner Bourton, Robin Cousins, Steve Pemberton, Tony Slattery, Jamie Theakston and O'Brien served as the show's narrators, introducing each musical number. The concert also featured guest appearances from the original Columbia Nell Campbell, and Kimi Wong, O'Brien's first wife and cast member from the 1975 film adaptation of the musical.

The concert was later released on DVD by Kultur International Films in October 2008.

2012–13 UK tour
In December 2012, a new production of The Rocky Horror Show began a year-long UK tour to celebrate the show's 40th anniversary.

Christopher Luscombe has returned to direct the production, which stars Oliver Thornton as Frank-N-Furter, Ben Forster (winner of ITV1 series Superstar) as Brad Majors until February 2013, Roxanne Pallett (of Emmerdale) as Janet Weiss until May 2013 and Rhydian Roberts (of The X Factor) as Rocky until March 2013. Unlike recent productions, the tour will not feature interchanging guest Narrators with Philip Franks taking on the role.

The show also features Kristian Lavercombe returning to the role of Riff Raff, Abigail Jaye as Magenta/Usherette, Ceris Hine reprising the role of Columbia, Joel Montague as Eddie/Dr Scott, and Maria Coyne, Christos Dante, David Gale, and Rachel Grundy as the Phantoms, with Andrew Ahern as the swing.

Live broadcast/2015–16 UK tour

In 2015, the tour was staged at the London Playhouse Theatre and also broadcast in many cinemas across Europe, as well as on the BBC in October 2015, with Richard O'Brien taking the role as Narrator for the London dates only. On opening night, he received seven standing ovations when appearing on-stage. Tickets for the first week sold out in 72 hours so a second week was added. A charity gala night on 17 September at the Playhouse featured actors Stephen Fry, Anthony Head and former Spice Girl Emma Bunton sharing the role of Narrator. A UK-wide tour followed the London production.

Australian productions

Riverina Trucking Company Production
In 1978, The Rocky Horror Show received its first regional production of Australia. Under the direction of Terry O'Connell and Les Winspear, the production was staged by the Riverina Trucking Company (RTC) in the city of Wagga Wagga, where it played for a three-week run. The cast featured Terry O'Connell as Frank-N-Furter, Bob Baines as Narrator, Kim Hillas as Usherette, Lynne Erskine as Janet Weiss, Toby Prentice as Brad Majors, Myles O'Meara as Riff Raff, Janette Crowe as Magenta, Elaine Mangan as Columbia, Les Winspear as Rocky Horror, and Ken Moffat as Eddie/Dr. Scott.

In 1981, director Peter Barclay's new interpretation of RTC production, marked by a fusion of directorial integrity and razzle-dazzle of colour and movement, opened on 22 July 1981 at Civic Theatre, Wagga Wagga. The cast included Terry O'Connell as Frank-N-Furter (reprising his role from the 1978 production), Annie Stanford as Janet, Paul Minifie as The Narrator, Bob Baines (another former member of the 1978 production) as Riff Raff, and Wayne Pygram as Rocky Horror.

1981-1982 Tour
Wilton Morley's new production of The Rocky Horror Show opened  6 October 1981 at the Theatre Royal, Sydney. The Sydney revival show toured successfully to Melbourne, Rockhampton, Townsville, Mount Isa, Canberra, Newcastle, Brisbane, Hobart, Launceston, Perth and Adelaide. David Toguri (who had previously done the choreography for the 1975 film adaptation of the musical) directed and choreographed the revival show.

The cast featured Daniel Abineri as Frank-N-Furter, who had previously played the role in the first UK tour in 1979 and for a year in London's West End Comedy Theatre in 1980, Antoinette Byron as Janet Weiss, David Frezza as Brad Majors, Perry Bedden (a cast member of the original 1975 film) as Riff Raff, Kerry Myers as Magenta/Usherette, Gina Mendoza as Columbia, Steve J. Spears as Eddie/Dr. Scott (later replaced by Ignatius Jones after the Sydney season), and Jay Hackett as Rocky Horror. During the tour, the role of The Narrator was shared between three different actors: Stuart Wagstaff, Ian "Molly" Meldrum (for 3 weeks in February during the Melbourne season) and Noel Ferrier (during the Adelaide season).

1984 Tour
In 1984 Wilton Morley revived the show to celebrate the tenth anniversary of the original Australian production and also marks Daniel Abineri's second Australian outing as Frank-N-Further and his directorial debut. Although Abineri did play the role for the majority of the run, at the beginning of the tour Garry Scale took the lead. Later, at the Rialto Theatre in Brisbane, set designer Geoff Bieleseld  used different stage levels to give the impression of space, which was an adaptation based on original designs by Brian Thomson. In Brisbane and Sydney Reg Livermore, the show's original Frank-N-Furter, was cast in the same role.

The cast featured Anne Looby as Janet Weiss, David Garrett as Brad Majors (later Graeme McKeachie during the Brisbane/Sydney seasons), David Wheeler as Riff Raff, Suzanne Dudley as Magenta/Usherette (later Nataly Mosco during the Brisbane/Sydney seasons), Jill Watt as Columbia (later Cassandra Webb, Gina Mendoza), Wayne Pygram as Eddie/Dr. Scott, Ray Coughlin as Rocky Horror, and Stuart Wagstaff as Narrator (early in the tour David Clendinning).

1985 Rural Tour
Peter Batey directed the new all-star revival-production, which starred Joe Daniels in the central role of Frank-N-Furter. The show was mounted for limited engagements from August till November 1985 in Townsville, Cairns, Mount Isa, Mackay, Gladstone, Rockhampton, Tweed Heads, Newcastle, Burnie, Launceston, Hobart, Canberra, Wagga Wagga, Albury, Wangaratta, Shepparton, Warragul, and Ballarat.

The production boasted a cast of popular music and television stars, such as Somebody's Image vocalist Russell Morris as Riff Raff, soap stars Maria Mercedes as Magenta, Ken James as Brad and Victoria Nicolls as Janet, singer-songwriter Glenn Shorrock as Eddie/Dr. Scott, Margaret Coyne as Columbia and Matthew Watters as Rocky.

1986–1988 Australasia Tour
Morley's production was re-launched yet again in 1986, with Daniel Abineri both as director and in the lead role of Frank-N-Furter. This time the tour commenced in New Zealand, where its cast included local actors Andrew Binns as Brad, Ann Wilson as Janet, Andrea Cunningham as Magenta/Usherette, Rachel King as Columbia and Russell Crowe as Eddie/Dr. Scott. For a brief stint, former New Zealand Prime Minister Robert Muldoon appeared as the Narrator.

The following year, the production transferred to the Princess Theatre (and later the Comedy Theatre) in Melbourne, Australia for an eight-month run, and toured Australia for several years visiting Sydney, Perth, Tweed Heads NSW, Brisbane (where it was staged as part of the 1988 World Expo), Parramatta, Newcastle and Canberra.

The cast featured Daniel Abineri as Frank-N-Furter, Megan Shapcott as Janet Weiss, Simon Westaway as Brad Majors, David Wheeler as Riff Raff, Lyn Shakespeare as Magenta/Usherette, Michelle Argue as Columbia (later Gina Mendoza), Steve Bastoni as Rocky Horror, and The Narrator variously was played by Gordon Chater, Stuart Wagstaff and others.

By the time the tour reached Brisbane, Daniel Abineri had retired as director and star and – based on Abineri's original production, Wilton Morley took over duties, with Simon Westaway (who had played previously Brad in the Australian tour) as Frank-N-Furter. Other cast changes included: Ann Wilson and Andrew Binns as Janet and Brad (reprising their roles from the New Zealand tour), Bob Baines (and later Greg Parke) as Riff Raff, Luz Yeomans as Magenta/Usherette, Walter Grkovic as Eddie /Dr. Scott, Anthony Russell as Rocky Horror, and Bernard King as Narrator.

The production ended with a second New Zealand tour, which was directed by Terry O'Connell (late of the Riverina Trucking Company productions) with Simon Westaway as Frank-N-Furter. The rest of the cast mainly comprised New Zealand talent, including actor/director John Banas and comedian Billy T. James alternating as the Narrator. The tour visited Wellington, Auckland, Palmerston North, Christchurch, Dunedin and officially came to an end in December 1988.

It has been noted for being the last production based on the original show's script and set design, before readaptation for the 1990 UK West End revival.

1992 Tour
In 1992, a revival production was launched by producer Paul Dainty under the title The New Rocky Horror Show. Directed and designed by Nigel Triffitt, it toured Australia, boasting a troupe of well-known Australian soap stars and comedians. Tour commenced Melbourne Comedy Theatre 2 July 1992 and the cast featured Craig McLachlan as Frank-N-Furter (later Marcus Graham), Gina Riley as Janet Weiss (later Ally Fowler), Stephen Kearney as Brad Majors (later Glenn Butcher), Linda Nagle as Magenta/ Usherette, Peter Rowsthorn as Riff Raff, Alyssa-Jane Cook as Columbia, Wilbur Wilde as Eddie/Dr. Scott (later Frankie J Holden), Christopher Kirby as Rocky Horror, and Red Symons as The Narrator.

1996 Tour
Nigel Triffitt's interpretation of the musical was revived in 1996 for a new national tour. The tour commenced in February at the Lyric Theatre in Brisbane, with Marcus Graham, Glenn Butcher, Peter Rowsthorn, Wilbur Wilde, and Red Symons reprising their roles from the 1992 tour. The new cast members featured Kym Wilson as Janet Weiss, Lucy Briant as Magenta, Jo Beth Taylor in the double role as Columbia and Usherette, and Ron Reeve as Rocky Horror. 

During the Perth season of the tour, Neighbours star Jason Donovan took over from Marcus Graham as Frank-N-Further.

When production completed its tour in Adelaide, the final cast featured Boom Crash Opera vocalist Dale Ryder as Frank-N-Furter, Jane Turner as Janet Weiss, Peter Rowsthorn (who started the tour in the role of Riff Raff) as Brad Majors, Richard Piper as Riff Raff, Lucy Briant as Magenta/Usherette, Annie Jones as Columbia/Usherette, George Kapiniaris as Eddie/Dr. Scott, Ron Reeve as Rocky Horror, singer Kamahl as Narrator.

The following year, in 1997, the production was revived for a tour of Hong Kong, featuring Dale Ryder as Frank-N-Furter, Lucy Briant as Janet, Geoff Pain as Brad, George Kapiniaris as Riff Raff, Jenny Vuletic as Magenta//Usherette, Hali Gordon as Columbia, Michael- John Hurney as Eddie/Dr. Scott Ron Reeve as Rocky and Harry Wong as Narrator.

1998 Sydney Revival
In July 1998, Nigel Triffitt re-mounted his interpretation of The New Rocky Horror Show at Sydney's Star City Casino, to celebrate the musical's 25th anniversary. The cast featured Tim Ferguson as Frank-N-Furter, Tottie Goldsmith as Janet Weiss, Dee Smart as Columbia/Usherette, and Jennifer Vuletic as Magenta/Usherette, while Glenn Butcher, Peter Rowsthorn, Wilbur Wilde, Ron Reeve and Red Symons (who all appeared in the original 1992 and 1996 tours of Triffitt's production) reprised their roles as Brad, Riff Raff, Eddie/Dr. Scott, Rocky and Narrator.

2004 Brisbane Revival
From 2 November to 28 November 2004, a revival of The Rocky Horror Show was staged at the Twelfth Night Theatre in Brisbane, under the direction of Tony Alcock, and produced by the On the Boards Theatre Company. The cast featured Stefan Cooper-Fox as Frank-N-Furter, Crystal Taylor as Janet Weiss, Brad Kendrick as Brad Majors, Venessa Crowley as Magenta and The Usherette, Graham Moore as Riff Raff, Jacy Lewis as Columbia, David Knijnenburg as Eddie and Dr. Scott, and Steven Tandy as The Narrator.

2004 Charity Concert
In November 2004, the cast of the Australian soap opera Neighbours staged a benefit concert production of Rocky Horror, to raise money for the charities Variety Club Australia and the Taralye School for Deaf Children. The concert starred Maria Mercedes as Frank-N-Furter (becoming the first woman to play the role), Alan Fletcher as Brad, Natalie Bassingthwaighte (who also produced the show) as Janet, Brett Swain as Riff Raff, Marcella Russo as Magenta, Marisa Warrington as Columbia, Bernard Curry as Eddie, Terence Donovan as Dr. Scott, Blair McDonough as Rocky Horror, Ian Smith as The Narrator, and Natalie Blair as the Usherette.

The concert ran as a one night only engagement at the Regent Theatre in Melbourne. The event raised $200,000 for the chosen charities.

2008 Australian Revival
In 2008, Gale Edwards staged a revival of The Rocky Horror Show at the Star Theatre in Sydney, Australia, where it played from 12 February to 30 March. The production starred iOTA as Frank-N-Furter, Kellie Rhode as Janet Weiss, Andrew Bevis as Brad Majors Tamsin Carroll as Magenta and the usherette, Paul Capsis as Riff Raff, Sharon Millerchip as Columbia (a role that won her a Helpmann Award for Best Female Actor in a Supporting Role in a Musical), Michael Cormick as Eddie and Dr. Scott, Simon Farrow as Rocky Horror, and John Waters as The Narrator.

The revival later transferred to the Comedy Theatre in Melbourne, where it played a seven-month run (from September 2008 to March 2009). Television presenter Gretel Killeen replaced Waters as the narrator for the first half of the Melbourne run, while media personality Derryn Hinch played the role for the remainder of the run.

2014–2015 Australian Tour
In January 2014, a new Australian tour of the UK production began to celebrate the show's 40th anniversary. While keeping a similar stage to the one in the UK Tour, it featured a new cast with Craig McLachlan reprising the role of Frank, which he played in the 1992 Australian Production. Additional cast members include Tim Maddren as Brad, Christie Whelan Browne (later Teagan Woulters) as Janet, Ashlea Pyke as Columbia, Erika Heynatz as Magenta/Usherette, Nicholas Christo as Eddie/Dr. Scott, Brendan Irving as Rocky, and Tony Farrell as the Narrator. Kristian Lavercombe reprises his role of Riff Raff from both the UK Tour and the New Zealand production. The Phantoms are played by Vincent Hooper, Luigi Lucente, Meghan O'Shea, Angela Scundi, and James Maxfield.

The Tour premiered in Brisbane on 10 January 2014 at the Queensland Performing Arts Centre and ran until 9 February. The tour then transferred to Perth's Crown Theatre and ran from 16 February 2014 to 9 March 2014. The performance transferred to the Adelaide Festival Centre to run from 21 March 2014 to 13 April 2014 with a preview on 20 March 2014. Richard O'Brien took over the role of the Narrator for the run in Adelaide. The performance then transferred to the Melbourne Comedy Theatre. It ran from 26 April 2014 with previews from 23 April 2014 before finishing its run on 22 June 2014.

The tour then took a break due to scheduling conflicts and McLachlan's involvement in The Doctor Blake Mysteries before transferring to the Sydney Lyric Theatre where it ran from 15 April 2015 to 7 June 2015. It featured new additional replacement cast members which included Stephen Mahy as Brad, Amy Lehpamer as Janet, Angelique Cassimatis as Columbia, Jayde Westaby as Magenta/Usherette, and Bert Newton as the Narrator. The Phantoms are played by Darren Tyler, Drew Weston, and Suzanne Steele.

The performance then returned for its final encore back at the Melbourne Comedy Theatre. It ran from 12 June 2015 before concluding on 19 July 2015 after being extended for one additional week due to popular demand. O'Brien took over the role of the Narrator for a week in Melbourne.

In December 2017, an encore tour began in Adelaide. Craig McLachlan briefly reprised his portrayal of Frank-N-Furter, but had to drop out of the production when it was alleged that during the original 2014 tour of Rocky Horror, he sexually assaulted cast members Erika Heynatz, Christie Whelan Browne and Angela Scundi. Ensemble member Adam Rennie took over the role of Frank throughout the rest of Adelaide season, and continued to play the part in Brisbane and Sydney, before being replaced by Todd McKenny for the Melbourne run of the show.

European productions

Belgian productions
In 1978, from 29 April to 10 June 1978, the Belgian production of the Rocky Horror Show was staged at Teater Arena Ghent in Belgium, under the direction of Jaak Van de Velde. The cast featured Daan Van den Durpel as Frank-N-Furter, Linda Lepomme as Janet, Marijn Devalck as Brad, Wim Huys as Riff-Raff, Carmen Jonckheere as Magenta/Usherette, Chris Thys as Columbia, Jakob Beks as Eddie/Dr. Scott, Paul Codde as Rocky Horror, and Bert Van Tichelen as The Narrator. The libretto was translated by Hugo Heinen and Rene Solleveld.

Credits: Production 1978. Director: Jaak Van de Velde; Decor and Costumes: Jacques Berwouts; Choreography: Lilly De Munter; Assistant Choreography: Daan Van Den Durpel; Photography: Guido De Leeuw; Sound: Jean-Pierre Bouckaert, Luc Vandeputte and Jacques Veys; Sound design: Jean-Pierre Bouckaert, Raf Lenssens and Luc Vandeputte, Backing: Nancy Dee; Music: Tony Boast, Raf Lenssens, Walter Stes and David Warwick.

The show was later remounted at the same venue from 19 November 1983 to 7 January 1984. The cast featured Daan Van den Durpel and Marijn Devalck reprising their portrayals of Frank-N-Furter and Brad, Norma Hendy as Janet, Karel Deruwe as Riff Raff, Daisy Haegeman as Magenta/Usherette, Annick Christiaens as Columbia, Jan de Bruyne as Eddie/Dr. Scott, Jo De Backer as Rocky Horror, and David Davidse as The Narrator. The show closed in early January the following year.

Credits: Production 1983–1984. Director: Jaak Van de Velde; Decor and Costumes: Jacques Berwouts; Choreography: Daan Van Den Durpel; Photography: Guido De Leeuw; Backing: Erna Plasterman; Orchestra: Tony Boast, Bart Bracke, Filip Demeyere, Willy Seeuws and Walter Stes.

Danish productions
The musical opened at the Gladsaxe Theater in Copenhagen, Denmark on 28 September 1974. The cast featured Willy Rathnov as Dr. Frank-N-Furter, Kirsten Peüliche as Janet Weiss,  as Brad Majors, Jesper Klein as Riff-Raff, Lykke Nielsen as Magenta/Usherette, Lisbet Lundquist as Columbia, Otto Brandenburg as Eddie/Dr. Scott, Bent Warburg as Rocky Horror, and Jørgen Buckhøj as The Narrator.

Two revival shows of the Danish production were staged under the direction of Per Pellesen, at the Aalborg Theater, Jutland in 1992 and at the Nørrebros Theater, Copenhagen in 2003.

Dutch productions
A Dutch-language version of the musical opened on 18 March 1976 at the Theater Royal, a former cinema, in Nieuwendijk, Netherlands. Produced by René Solleveld, who also served as co-translator for the libretto, working with screenwriter Hugo Heinen. Directed by Derek Goldby; choreography by Serge-Henri Valcke; decor and costumes by Bob Ringwood; musical direction by Ruud Bos and performed by, the Amsterdam-based rock band, "Water".

The cast featured Hugo Metsers as Dr. Frank-N-Furter, Trudy de Jong as Janet Weiss, Derek de Lint as Brad Majors, Hans Beijer as Riff-Raff, Moniek Toebosch as Magenta/Usherette, Thea Ranft as Columbia, Robert Funcke as Eddie/Dr. Scott, Peter van de Wouw as Rocky Horror, and Jan Staal as The Narrator.

The show only ran for a month, before poor ticket sales forced it to close.

French productions
A French-language version of the musical was staged at the Théâtre de la Porte Saint-Martin, Paris in 1975. Production by Jean-Pierre Reyes in association with Michael White. Original text and music booklet by Richard O'Brien; adapted into French by Javier Arroyuelo and Rafael Lopez Sanchez, the song's lyrics were translated by Alain Boublil; directed by Pierre Spivakoff; sets and costumes by Elisabeth Saurel and choreography by Victor Upshaw.

The cast featured Pierre Spivakoff as Dr. Frank-N-Furter, Nathalie Brehal as Janet Weiss, Roger Mirmont as Brad Majors (renamed Paul in the production), Gérard Surugue as Riff-Raff,  as Magenta/The Usherette, Celia Booth as Columbia, Ticky Holgado as Eddie/Dr. Scott, Jeffrey Kime as Rocky Horror, Geoffrey Carey as The Narrator.

German productions
In 1980, two different interpretations of the musical were staged in Germany.

In 1980 director Walter Bockmayer, released The Rocky Horror Show in Essen as a German premiere, which opened on 20 January 1980 at the Grillo-Theater. This production deviated greatly from the original London productions in regards to characterisation, costuming and set design. Instead of the morbid castle Bockmayer's extravagant design set his lustful Transylvanians in a sterile hospital on time travel.

Frank-N-Furter was played by the American guest star Decoven C. Washington, who thus became  the first black man to embody the main antagonist. The cast also featured Rotraut Rieger as Janet Weiss, Detlev Greisner as Brad Majors, Fritz Brieserheister as Riff-Raff, Jutta Bryde as Magenta, Sue Hürzeler as Columbia, Yoyo Petit as Eddie, Manfried Hilbig as Dr. Scott, Till Krabbe as Rocky Horror, Siegfried Wittig as Narrator, and Helmut Fülberth as Usherette.

The second was a production imported from England by producer Cameron Mackintosh, which ran briefly in October/November. The show was supposed to have an extensive run, but a lack of co-operation from the German producers saw Mackintosh pull the show after only a few weeks. Mackintosh's production primarily featured a cast of English actors, which included Jeff Shankley as Frank-N-Furter, Philip Bretherton as Brad, Perry Bedden (a cast member from the film adaptation of Rocky Horror) as Riff-Raff, Trevor Byfield as Eddie/Dr. Scott, and Nicholas Courtney as The Narrator.

Norwegian production
The musical premiered on 11 October 1977 at the Oslo Nye Centralteatret in Oslo, Norway, boasting a cast of both established actors and popular names from the music industry. The production was directed by David Toguri (with assistance from Brian Thomson), while Richard O'Brien's original script was translated into Norwegian by actor Johan Fillinger and musician Ole Paus. The show generated heated controversy in the press, with newspapers and commentators declaring that the show signified the decline of morality in the country. But despite the press' hostility, the show performed a total of 129 times, before officially closing 18 March 1978.

The cast featured Knut Husebø as Dr. Frank-N-Furter, Kari Ann Grønsund as Janet Weiss (renamed "Janee" in the production), Ivar Nørve as Brad Majors (renamed "Jan"), Jahn Teigen as Riff-Raff, Gro Anita Schønn as Magenta and The Usherette, Julie Ege as Columbia, Per Elvis Granberg as Eddie, Egil Åsman as Dr. Scott, Zakhir Helge Linaae as Rocky Horror, and Bjarne Bø as The Narrator.

Spanish productions
The first Spanish staging of the musical was performed in Madrid, Spain from September 1974 to July 1975, which was presented as "a sexual satirical musical" directed by Gil Carretero. The libretto was translated and adapted by Juan José Plans and Roberto Estevez, who toned down the original script's profanity an approach in response to censorship during the Franco regime.

The cast featured Alfonso Nadal as Frank-N-Furter (renamed Frank-Burguesa), Flora Maria Alvaro as Janet Weiss (renamed Sibilia Cooley), Miguel Angel Godo as Brad Majors (renamed Thiero Smith), Alberto Berco as The Narrator, Pedro Mari Sanchez as Rocky Horror, Ricardo Zabala as Riff Raff, Raquel Ramirez as Columbia, Adolfo Rodriguez as Eddie/Dr. Scott and Mayra Gómez Kemp in the double role as Magenta/ Usherette.

The show opened Cerebro Music Hall, playing every weeknight as an adults-only event at 11:00 pm to standing room only. Saturday nights would also include a second show that played at 1:00 am. The show received considerable media attention, due to its boundary-pushing themes being considered as a personal attack towards the Franco Regime that was ruling the country at that time.

After completing its run at the La Discoteca Cerebro, the show reopened at the Teatro Valle-Inclán, where it played from August to October 1975.

In 1977, a Catalan-language version of the musical directed by Ventura Pons and produced by Jordi Morell, with the slogan "L'espectacle més desmadrat del segle" (The most riotous show of the century), premiered on 4 March 1977 at Teatro Romea in Barcelona. The libretto was translated by Narcissus Comadira, who, like the translators of the Madrid production, changed the names of the three leads, Frank-N-Further, Janet Weiss and Brad Majors. The characters were renamed Dr. Frank Esteve, Anna Prou Grossa and Ramon Poch. The cast featured Oriol Tramvia as Frank, Maria Cinta as "Anna", Jordi Ponti as "Ramon", Guillem Paris as Riff Raff, Christa Leem as Magenta and The Usherette, Dolores Laffite as Columbia, Enric Pous as Eddie/Dr. Scott, Pau Bizarro as Rocky Horror, Biel Moll as The Narrator.

European Tour 1996–2005

Directed by Christopher Malcolm (the original Brad), Choreographed by Stacey Haynes and co-produced with BC&E German Producers, the cast of the 1996–2005 European Tour included: Bob Simon/William E. Lester/Paul Pecorino as Frank-N-Furter; David Schmittou as Brad Majors; Ellen Hoffman as Janet Weiss Amanda-Jane Manning; Caroline Liadakis/Jo Gibb/Lisa Boucher as Columbia; Sherry Hart/Lydia Taylor/Karin Inghammar as Magenta; David Nehls/Gene Dante as Riff Raff; David Velarde as Rocky Horror; Ted Anderson as Eddie/Dr. Scott; and Hans B. Goetzfried as The Narrator.

A soundtrack CD was released by Lava Records/Polymedia International Music Service. This had been recorded in January 1996 at the Livingstone Studios in London.

European Tour 2008–09
The 2008-9 European tour began at the Admiralspalast Theater in Berlin, Germany in November 2008. Performers included Rob Morton Fowler as Frank-N-Furter; Ceri-Lyn Cissone as Janet; Chris Ellis-Stanton as Brad; Stuart Matthew Price as Riff Raff; Maria Franzen as Magenta; Kerry Winter as Columbia; Jack Edwards as Eddie/Dr. Scott; and Andrew Gordon-Watkins as Rocky.

European Tour 2014–15
The 2014-15 European tour began at the Lanxess Arena in Cologne in late October 2014 before travelling to Zurich, Basel, Dortmund, Bremen, Düsseldorf, Stuttgart, Vienna, Frankfurt am Main and Berlin among other venues. The cast included Rob Morton Fowler as Frank-N-Furter, Harriet Bunton as Janet, David Ribi as Brad, Stuart Matthew Price as Riff Raff, Hannah Cadec as Columbia, Maria Franzén as Magenta, Vincent Gray as Rocky and Charles Brunton as Eddie/Dr. Scott.

European Tour 2017–18

A European tour of Rocky Horror commenced in Cologne in Germany in October 2017, visiting venues across Germany and Italy before ending in Hanover in April 2018.

The cast includes: Gary Tushaw - Frank-N-Furter; Sophie Isaacs - Janet; Felix Mosse - Brad; Stuart Matthew Price - Riff Raff; Anna Lidman - Magenta; Holly Atterton - Columbia; Ryan Goscinski - Rocky; and Daniel Fletcher - Eddie / Dr. Scott

U.S. productions

1978 Jericho production
In December 1978, the musical was staged for an eleven night run at the Westbury Music Festival in Jericho, New York. This was the second official production in the US after the 1975 Broadway production, and after the film's release.

The cast featured Justin Ross as Frank-N-Furter, Kristen Meadows as Janet Weiss, Stephan Burns as Brad Majors, Richard Casper as Riff-Raff, Diane Duncan as Magenta and Trixie, the Westbury Popcorn Girl (a version of The Usherette), Kitty Preston as Columbia, Robert Zanfini as Eddie and Dr. Scott, Michael Hawke as Rocky Horror, Randolph Walker as The Narrator.

During the first night, the audience called back to the actors, as they did with the film. The cast were unsure how to react. Despite the unexpected heckling, the show was a success.

1980 North American production
The Rocky Horror Show toured North America. The cast featured Frank Gregory as Frank-N-Furter, Marcia Mitzman as Janet, Frank Piergo as Brad, Pendleton Brown as Riff Raff, Lorelle Brina as Magenta, Meghan Duffy as Trixie, C. J. Critt as Columbia, Kim Milford as Rocky, and Steve Lincoln as the Narrator.

2000 Broadway revival
The Rocky Horror Show had a longer revival on Broadway from October 2000 to January 2002 at the Circle in the Square Theatre and featured Tom Hewitt (later Terrence Mann) as Frank-N-Furter, Alice Ripley as Janet, Jarrod Emick (also Luke Perry) as Brad, Raúl Esparza (later Sebastian Bach) as Riff Raff, Joan Jett as Columbia/Usherette (later Ana Gasteyer), Lea DeLaria (later Jason Wooten) as Eddie/Dr. Scott, and Daphne Rubin-Vega as Magenta.

From October 2001 to January 2002, several guest celebrities played the Narrator role normally performed by Dick Cavett (Kate Clinton took over for a week while Cavett was on vacation), including Gilbert Gottfried, Sally Jesse Raphael, Robin Leach, magicians Penn & Teller, New York Post columnist Cindy Adams, MTV personality Dave Holmes, and talk show host Jerry Springer. It is suggested that the revival, like other shows running at the time, closed early because of financial losses during the time following 9/11: Rubin-Vega recalled, "It went from full house to practically two people." The revival was nominated for the following Tony Awards: Best Actor: Tom Hewitt; Best Costume Designer: David C. Woolard; Best Director: Christopher Ashley; and Best Musical Revival.

35th Anniversary benefit performance
In October 2010, Kenny Ortega directed a benefit performance of Rocky Horror to celebrate the musical's 35th anniversary. The show was staged as a one-night only event at the Wiltern Theatre in Los Angeles, and featured Julian McMahon as Frank, Matthew Morrison as Brad, Lea Michele (Act 1) and Nicole Scherzinger (Act 2) as Janet, Scherzinger as The Usherette, Evan Rachel Wood as Magenta, Lucas Grabeel as Riff Raff, Melora Hardin as Columbia, Jorge Garcia as Eddie, George Lopez as Dr. Scott, Mike Breman as Rocky, and Jack Nicholson and Danny DeVito sharing the role of The Criminologist. The performance also featured a special guest appearance from Rocky Horror veterans Tim Curry and Barry Bostwick, who joined the anniversary cast for an encore of "The Time Warp".

The event's proceeds went to the charity The Painted Turtle, a California camp for children with chronic or life-threatening illnesses.

2019 Salem production
In October 2019, the musical was staged in the capitol of Oregon at Salem's Historic Grand Theatre with professional regional theatre company Enlightened Theatrics. Presented to coincide with the 45th Anniversary, the show ran from 9 October through 3 November, and starred Rhansen Mars as Frank-N-Furter, Nicholas D.G. Hikes as Riff Raff, Margo Schembre as Magenta, and Cassandra Pangelinan as Columbia. Following the previews for this production, the nation's first openly transgender mayor, Stu Rasmussen, moderated post-show talk backs with the cast.

Canadian Productions

1976 Toronto
In 1976, the musical, in a production by The Actors' Stage Company, received its Canadian premiere at the Ryerson Theatre in Toronto. The cast included Brent Carver as Dr. Frank-N-Furter,
a young Kim Cattrall as Janet Weiss, Ross Douglas as Brad Majors, Louis Negin (who also served as the production's director) as Riff-Raff, and Tabby Johnson as Columbia. The show ran for three weeks from 29 June to 17 July.

2018 Stratford Festival
In 2018, the world renowned Stratford Festival; more synonymous with the works of William Shakespeare and other classics performed in repertory presented Rocky Horror as part of its 2018 season. Choreographed and Directed by Stratford stalwart Donna Feore, Rocky Horror played to packed houses, and was extended multiple times past its originally scheduled closing date of Halloween; finally closing on 2 December 2018 as the longest running production in the Stratford Festival's 66-year history.

Latin American productions

1975 Brazilian production
In February 1975, The Rocky Horror Show made its debut at Teatro da Praia in Rio de Janeiro, Brazil. The libretto was translated and adapted by Jorge Mautner, Joe Rodrix and Kao Rossman, in whose hands saw a great deal of Richard O'Brien's original script adapted to suit Brazilian audiences. As the Hollywood horror and sci-fi films that the musical references were not that well known in Brazil at that time, references to the local culture was instead incorporated into the show. (For example: The lyric "What ever happened to Faye Wray" in the floor show sequence was changed to reference popular Brazilian samba singer Carmen Miranda.)

The cast featured Eduardo Conde as Dr. Frank-N-Furter, Diana Strella as Janet Weiss, Wolf Maia as Brad Majors, Tom Zé as Riff-Raff, Betina Viany as Magenta, Vera Setta as Columbia, Zé Rodrix as Eddie and Dr. Scott, Acácio Gonçalves as Rocky Horror, Nildo Parente as The Narrator, and Lucélia Santos as Baleira (a character possibly based on The Usherette from the original show).

1975 Argentinian production
In July 1975, Héctor Cavallero and Leonardo Barujel staged Gil Carretero's vision of The Rocky Horror Show at Teatro Pigalle in Buenos Aires, Argentina. The show was directed by Gil Carretero, who also mounted and directed the Madrid production, and libretto was adapted by Jorge Schussheim. The characters Frank-N-Furter, Brad and Janet were renamed to Frank Burguesa, Ceiro and Sibila. The Usherette renamed to Acomodadora.

The cast featured Osvaldo Alé as "Frank Burguesa", Valeria Lynch as "Sibila Cooley", Ricardo Pald as "Theiro Smith", Sergio Villar as Riff-Raff, Linda Peretz as Magenta / Acomodadora, Anna Maria Cores as Columbia, Carlos Wibratt as Eddie and Dr. Scott, Eddie Sierra (aka Yeffry) as Rocky, and Rolo Puente as The Narrator. Martha Hendrix and Enrique Quintanilla (Fantasmas).

The show opened at a cabaret-style venue. A few days after the premiere, unknown assailants threw a Molotov cocktail at the theater, which aimed to cause casualties. There was a minor fire that did not damage the hall, some functions were suspended, but the show continued and ran for three months. Triple A was believed to have been responsible, employing violent tactics against suspected dissidents and subversives. Due to political persecutions, frequent threats and censorship, the company was disbanded.

1976 Mexican production
Richard O'Brien's musical first came to Mexico in 1976 through the pioneering efforts of Julissa, Mexican actress, producer and singer. "El Show de Terror de Rocky", premiered on 11 March in a novel concept of cabaret theater, in the Versailles hall of the now defunct Hotel of the Prado. It later transferred to Teatro Venustiano Carranza.

Julissa's Spanish translation of song lyrics includes changes to the names of main characters - Brad and Janet become Carlos and Chelo while Dr. Scott is instead Dr. Carrillo.

The cast featured Julissa as "Chelo", Gonzalo Vega as Dr. Frank-N-Furter, Hector Ortiz as "Carlos", Luis Tomer as Riff-Raff, Paloma Zozaya as Magenta and Usherette, Norma Lendech as Columbia, Lauro Pavón as Eddie and "Dr. Carrillo", Cecil Goudie as Rocky Horror, and Manuel Gurria as Narrator.

A cast recording of the production was released on LP in a small volume, later converted to CD-R and eventually a commercial CD.

In 1986, a second production was staged in Mexico, presented again by Julissa.

2013 Panamanian production
In 2013 the English community Theatre Guild of Ancon presented the show under the direction of Melanie Gilpin (Lee). The show ran from 24 October,25,26,31 – 1 November,2 – 2013.

2016 Brazilian production
In 2016, a new staging premiered in São Paulo under the direction and production of Charles Möeller and Cláudio Botelho, a famous duo who signed previous successful Brazilian adaptations, such as Spring Awakening and The Sound of Music. The cast included Marcelo Médici (Frank), Bruna Guerin (Janet), Felipe de Carolis (Brad), Gottsha (Magenta/Usherette), Thiago Machado (Riff Raff), Jana Amorim (Columbia), Nicola Lama (Eddie / Dr. Scott), Felipe Mafra (Rocky) and Marcel Octavio (Narrator) with Vanessa Costa and Thiago Garça (Ghosts).

Shortly before the premiere of the musical, Botelho became embroiled in controversy after posting transphobic and homophobic comments on his personal Facebook page regarding trans people. In his words:

Following the event, many Facebook users have expressed outrage at Botelho's claims. In his defense, the director said that the comments were nothing more than a joke and that they were taken out of context. According to him, it was just a discussion about the casting of actress Laverne Cox for the then-upcoming television film.

The production was still highly successful, especially for the large number of cosplayers who, at the end of very show, were invited to dance the "Time Warp" on stage with the cast.

New Zealand
The musical had its New Zealand premiere in 1978, where it went on a national tour. The cast featured controversial rocker Gary Glitter as Dr. Frank-N-Furter, Jenni Anderson as Janet Weiss, John Collingwood-Smith as Brad Majors, Sal Sharah as Riff-Raff (reprising his role from the original Australian premiere), Sharron Skelton as Magenta/Usherette, Suburban Reptiles vocalist Clare Elliott (under the stage name "Zero") as Columbia, Paul Johnstone (a former understudy from the original Australian premiere) as Eddie/Dr. Scott, Rayner Bourton as Rocky Horror (later Graham Matters), and Keith Richardson as The Narrator.

Asian productions

Japanese productions
The first Japan performances of the Rocky Horror Show, presented by Walking Elephants Ltd., was scheduled from 23 June through 9 September 1975 in Tokyo and Osaka, and opened at the Rocky Horror Theatre (more commonly known as the Miyakezaka Hall) in Akasaka, Tokyo. Directed for Japan by Christie Dickason with an all-English cast including Trevor Byfield as Frank-N-Furter, Christopher Malcolm and Belinda Sinclair as Brad and Janet, Rayner Bourton as Rocky (reprising their roles from the original London run), and Peter Bayliss as The Narrator. Other cast members, included: Judith Lloyd (Columbia), Caroline Noh (Magenta/Usherette), Desmond McNamara (Riff-Raff) and Neil McCaul (Eddie/Dr. Scott).

After the Tokyo performance, there were also regional performances. The popularity of the tour led to special single recordings of "Sweet Transvestite" performed by Trevor Byfield  and "Touch-a, Touch-a, Touch-a, Touch Me" by Belinda Sinclair.

In 1976 Walking Elephant Co. Ltd. presented an encore tour directed by David Toguri, which saw the show visit 16 cities in three and a half months. Venues included Tokyo, Osaka, Kyoto, Kobe, Sapporo and Fukuoka. The tour's cast featured Martin Asscher as Dr. Frank-N-Furter (later Derek Damon), Deirdre Dee as Janet Weiss, Derek Beard as Brad Majors, John Dicks as Riff-Raff, Tina Jones as Magenta/Usherette, Jeannie Mc'Artur as Columbia, Peter Dawson as Eddie/Dr. Scott, James Smith as The Narrator, and Rayner Bourton returning as Rocky.

Singapore
Based on the 2009–10 UK Tour and following runs in South Korea and New Zealand in 2010, Christopher Luscombe's international touring production ended at the Esplanade Theatre, Singapore, in January 2012. The international cast was joined by local stage and screen actor Hossan Leong as the Narrator whilst two further UK Tour actors joined the company with Kara Lane and Daniela Valvano reprising their roles as Magenta/Usherette and Phantom, respectively. This production was the first uncensored version of The Rocky Horror Show to be performed in Singapore with the previous 1993 production having been toned down. The film adaptation was banned until 2003.

Seoul 
In August 2010, a new production based on the 2009–10 UK Tour opened in Seoul, South Korea starring Juan Jackson as Frank-N-Furter and Kristian Lavercombe as Riff Raff with an international cast. Following the seven-week run the production commenced a limited tour of New Zealand in November 2010, playing at theatres in Auckland, Wellington and Christchurch with Richard O'Brien as the Narrator. UK Tour actors Richard Meek and Haley Flaherty reprised their roles as Brad and Janet for the final week of the New Zealand run, flying out days after the end of the UK production in December 2010.

Legacy 
Beyond its cult status, The Rocky Horror Show is also widely hailed, alongside other experimental theatre works such as Hair, to have been an influence on the countercultural and sexual liberation movements that followed on from the 1960s. It was one of the first popular musicals to depict fluid sexuality during a time of division between generations and a lack of sexual difference acceptance.

As a result, the show received "a mauling from New York-based critic Rex Reed, who said the production 'was only for homosexuals'". However, O'Brien stated that it is rather a celebration of difference that allows marginalized communities to gather and coexist. Unlike Reed, other critics would suggest that "though many people might laugh at the notion, Rocky Horror is in many ways a serious musical and a serious social document".

The musical was ranked eighth in a BBC Radio 2 listener poll of the "Nation's Number One Essential Musicals". The Rocky Horror Show was one of eight UK musicals featured on Royal Mail stamps, issued in February 2011. In January 2023, it was announced that there would be an NFT collection to celebrate the 50th anniversary of the stage show's first appearance.

Casts

Notable Broadway Revival Replacements 
Frank-N-Furter: Terrence Mann 
Brad Majors: Luke Perry 
Riff-Raff: Sebastian Bach 
Columbia: Liz Larsen, Ana Gasteyer 
Narrator: Penn & Teller, Jerry Springer, Sally Jessy Raphael, Cindy Adams, Dave Holmes, Gilbert Gottfried, Robin Leach, Kate Clinton

Cast recordings

 1973 London Cast
 1974 Roxy Cast
 1974 Australian Cast (starring Reg Livermore)
 1975 Brazilian Cast (starring Alfonso Nadal)
 1975 Film Soundtrack
 1976 Mexican Cast (starring Gonzalo Vega)
 1977 Norwegian Cast (starring Knut Husebø)
 1978 New Zealand Cast (starring Gary Glitter)
 1980 German Cast
 1981 Australian Cast (starring Daniel Abineri)
 1990 London Cast ("The Whole Gory Story") (starring Tim McInnerny)
 1991 Icelandic Cast
 1992 Australian Cast (starring Craig McLachlan)
 1994 German Cast
 1995 New Zealand Cast
 1995 Finnish Cast (starring Mika Honkanen)
 1995 Icelandic Cast
 1995 German Cast
 1995 Studio Cast (featuring Christopher Lee as The Criminologist and Brian May as Eddie)
 1996 Danish Cast (starring Kim Leprévost)
 1996–97 European Tour (starring Bob Simon)
 1997 German Cast
 1998 London Cast
 1998 South African Cast
 2001 Broadway Cast (with Lea DeLaria as Eddie/Dr. Scott)
 2001 Korean Cast
 2001 Peruvian Cast
 2002 Philippine Cast
 2004 Tribute Soundtrack (performed by The West End Orchestra & Singers)
 2005 Vancouver Cast
 2007 Panamanian Cast
 2009 Mexican Cast
 2010 Icelandic Cast
 2010 Glee Tribute Soundtrack
 2011 Polish Cast
 2011 Japanese Cast
 2014 Australian Cast (starring Jason Donovan)
 2014 Theatreland Chorus
 2016 Film Soundtrack
 2018 Icelandic Cast (starring Páll Óskar)

Awards and nominations
The original London production won the award for Best Musical of 1973 at the Evening Standard Awards in January 1974.         Additionally, both the original Broadway production and the 2000 revival of the musicals have accrued nominations for both Tony Awards and Drama Desk Awards.

Original London production

Original Broadway production

2001 Broadway revival

References

External links

 Official Rocky Horror Show UK Tour web site
 

1973 musicals
British plays adapted into films
Broadway musicals
Drag (clothing)-related musicals
Original musicals
Rock musicals
West End musicals